Henry Smith Elkington (22 February 1890 – 5 May 1963) was an Australian rules footballer who played with Essendon in the Victorian Football League (VFL).

Notes

External links 

1890 births
1963 deaths
Australian rules footballers from Victoria (Australia)
Essendon Football Club players